Career of Evil is a 2015 crime fiction novel by J. K. Rowling, published under the pseudonym Robert Galbraith. It is the third novel in the Cormoran Strike series of detective novels and is followed by Lethal White in 2018 and Troubled Blood in 2020.

Plot
After murdering a woman, an unidentified man stalks Robin Ellacott, whom he sees as part of his plan to exact revenge against private investigator Cormoran Strike. Robin, having worked for Strike for a year, is now a full-time investigator in addition to being his secretary. Strike has developed a relationship with radio presenter Elin but continues to harbour feelings for Robin, whose fiancé Matthew disapproves of the work she is doing.

One day, Robin receives a package containing a woman's severed leg and a message quoting the Blue Öyster Cult song "Mistress of the Salmon Salt (Quicklime Girl)". Strike, who recognises the song as a favourite of his deceased mother, Leda, concludes someone from his past sent the package. He then approaches Detective Inspector Eric Wardle with four possible suspects, three of whom he knew from his time in the SIB:
Terrence "Digger" Malley, a member of the Haringey Crime Syndicate who has a history of mailing severed body parts and was sent to prison after Strike anonymously testified against him; 
Noel Brockbank, a Gulf War veteran and serial paedophile whom Strike had investigated and who blames Strike for taking his family away from him;
Donald Laing, a former member of the King's Own Royal Border Regiment who Strike arrested for physically abusing his wife and child, which resulted in a dishonourable discharge and a 10-year prison sentence; 
Jeff Whittaker, Strike's stepfather and the prime suspect in Leda's death by overdose, who Strike believes to be responsible despite the fact that Whittaker was acquitted

To Strike's annoyance, the police only focus their investigation on Malley because of his previous tactic of mailing body parts. Strike and Robin decide to initiate a parallel investigation, which they begin by reviewing 'unusual correspondence' that had been sent to the office throughout the years, stored in what the pair light-heartedly call the 'nutters' drawer. Found among these are several letters from a young woman who had once requested Strike's help in amputating her own leg as a result of body dysmorphia. They begin to fear that the leg sent to Robin had belonged to this young woman.

During a row about work, Robin deduces that Matthew had slept with a university friend after Robin had dropped out, which Matthew reluctantly admits is true. Robin furiously calls off their engagement and, drunk and miserable in a bar, she reveals to Strike the reason behind her departure from university. Strike is astonished by the revelation that Robin had been raped and left for dead by an unknown attacker in the middle of her university career, but is impressed when she informs him that her testimony and evidence resulted in the rapist being convicted. While Robin fears that her confession will predispose Strike to treat her like a victim, Strike inwardly resolves not to do exactly that.

Later, Strike travels to Edinburgh, where one of his former SIB colleagues is now stationed. The colleague 'forgets' to close out of Brockbank's military personnel file and leaves the room due to his inability to disclose its contents to Strike, who is now classed as a civilian. Strike thereby discovers that Brockbank's pension cheques are being sent to an address in Barrow-in-Furness. While in Scotland, Strike also borrows his colleague's car to visit Melrose, where Laing's mother still lives. Hoping to gather information about Laing's current whereabouts, he is disappointed to find that Laing's mother has late-stage dementia and is incapable of providing any help.

In a stroke of luck, however, Strike is recognised and approached by one of her neighbours. The neighbour is good friends with the parents of Rona, Laing's ex-wife whom he was convicted of abusing, and agrees to arrange a meeting. Rona's mother expresses continuing gratitude to Strike – he was the person who discovered her daughter naked and chained to a bed – and enthusiastically offers any help she can. She informs Strike that Laing has not been welcome in Melrose for some time due to his violent behaviour, but that he did recently attempt to visit his mother before being forcefully driven away by his brothers. Rona's mother further reveals that, during Laing's childhood, a field owned by a farmer who had dismissed Laing from his employ was mysteriously burned down, that several girls in the area had accused Laing of rape, and that she strongly suspects him of killing their family cat after she and her husband warned Rona of their concerns regarding her then-boyfriend. None of these suspicions were ever confirmed because of Laing's charm when speaking to police. Finally, Rona's mother admits that Laing had visited Rona once since leaving prison and had threatened to kill her in retribution for his son, who had died of neglect while Rona was chained to the bed. Now in possession of a photograph of Laing – which Rona's mother had kept in the belief that she would one day need to give it to the police – Strike returns to London.

Wardle's investigative team soon discovers that the leg sent to Robin is a DNA match for the recently discovered body of the would-be amputee who had written to Strike. Shortly thereafter Robin is sent another package, this time containing a toe from the left foot of the same corpse, along with more Blue Öyster Cult lyrics. Strike becomes very concerned with the fact that both packages, while clearly meant to taunt him personally, had been addressed and sent to Robin by name. The negative publicity resultant from their receipt of the leg, combined with Strike's efforts to protect Robin from the risk posed by the killer, jeopardise both Strike's business and their working relationship.

Using the old Land Rover gifted her by her parents, Robin drives Strike from London to Barrow-in-Furness to seek out Holly Brockbank, the person who has been cashing Noel's military pension cheques. Robin displays great skill in questioning Holly outside of Strike's presence, in the guise of a lawyer called Venetia Hall, whose firm was interested in pursuing compensation for Noel's military injuries. Robin discovers that Holly is Noel's twin sister who had been left to care for him following his departure from the army, which was the result of a brain injury that also left him physically disfigured. Holly reveals that Noel had been prone to violent outbursts, destroying her flat more than once and occasionally striking her. She discloses that their stepfather had molested them for their entire childhood and that she is aware that her brother is a paedophile. After a particularly violent outburst, Holly had finally kicked Noel out of her flat and had threatened to tell the police of his sexual proclivities. In desperation, Noel had offered Holly his military pension in exchange for her silence. Holly also confirms that Noel's blaming of Strike for his circumstances have amounted to an obsession and that he brings the subject up to anybody and everybody without provocation. Before leaving, Robin is able to extract Brockbank's most recent place of work from his sister.

On their journey southwards they visit a massage parlour in Market Harborough where Brockbank had worked as a bouncer, and then Laing's last known address in Corby and meet Lorraine, a middle-aged woman with whom Laing had been living shortly after leaving prison. Lorraine provides important information such as the fact that Laing now suffers from psoriatic arthritis, and provides them with a more current photograph in which his physique is almost unrecognisably different from Strike's memory. She describes Laing as moody but nonviolent, admitting that he did rob her of her money and jewellery before leaving suddenly. She was unaware that he was ever married or that he had been to prison.

During the long car rides between towns, Strike gradually brings Robin up to speed on his ex-stepfather, Jeff Whittaker. Strike reveals that Whittaker displays all the symptoms of being a narcissist sociopath and that he has always been unusually fascinated by death. He had been given to quoting Satanic lyrics at Strike regularly, especially those glorifying death and decay. Strike asserts that, although his mother had been a notorious rock groupie, she had never taken heroin at the time that she supposedly overdosed, which occurred suspiciously soon after a confrontation with Whittaker over money. Strike reveals that Whittaker was found to have kept a dead woman's body with him in a flat for over a month some years after Leda Strike's death. As Robin and Strike approach the end of their travels, Strike is tipped off that Whittaker is currently living in London, pimping and possibly selling methamphetamine.

The killer strikes twice more during the investigation, cutting two fingers from one victim who survives and the ear lobes from another, leading to the killer becoming known as the Shacklewell Ripper and officially transitioning the police case into a hunt for a serial murderer. Meanwhile, Wardle's brother is struck and killed in a hit-and-run motor accident, necessitating his departure from work. He relinquishes control of the case to Detective Chief Inspector Roy Carver, the lead investigator on the Lula Landry case. Carver remains furious that Strike was able to humiliate the police by solving the case, which Carver himself had ruled a suicide. He spitefully informs Strike that the open line into the department's investigation he had enjoyed while Wardle was in command has closed and threatens legal action if Strike continues his own investigation. Exploiting a technicality, Strike agrees not to interfere with Carver's suspects, who are vastly different from his own three leads.

Strike and Robin alternately tail Whittaker, whom they learn is squatting in an apartment with a young woman called Stephanie whom he is pimping. Noticing Stephanie's severe bruises, Robin sympathises and attempts to help her. Although unwilling to leave Whittaker, she does reveal that, on the night the first victim would have been killed, Whittaker had forced her to have sex with his entire band in a van. Robin therefore concludes that, while Whittaker is abominable, he cannot be the Shacklewell Ripper. Shortly after Whittaker interrupts her meeting with Stephanie, Robin is attacked and nearly killed by the real Ripper. She receives a long gash up her arm but manages to set off a rape alarm which attracts help and sprays him in the eyes with red paint, though she never sees his face. In the aftermath of this attack, Strike believes he has identified the killer, but Carver disregards all of Strike's information. Strike loses both of his remaining clients.

Robin takes action against Brockbank without Strike's knowledge, as she believes that he is now molesting his current girlfriend's young daughters. Robin's intervention saves the girls, but sends Brockbank into hiding. When Strike discovers what Robin has done, he explains that Carver suspects her of having visited Brockbank on Strike's instruction and is rallying to arrest him for interfering in a police investigation. Overcome by his situation with Carver, the loss of his only remaining clients and Robin's extremely close call with the murderer, Strike fires her for gross misconduct. Robin is bereft, but returns to Masham for her impending wedding to Matthew, with whom she has reconciled. Strike tries to contact her, but Matthew removes evidence of this from Robin's phone.

Now working alone, Strike forms a plan to corner the killer, whom he is now sure he has identified. The killer is Donald Laing, who has built a parallel identity as Ray Williams, the live-in boyfriend of the would-be amputee's older sister. Together with his thug acquaintance Shanker, Strike gains access to the flat that Laing is using as a base for his killing activities. Inside, he is attacked by Laing but manages to overcome him before successfully handing him over to the police. Brockbank is also apprehended as a result of a tip from a local homeless shelter.

Now free from the stress of the murderer, Strike decides to repair his relationship with Robin by attending her wedding, the invitation to which was never formally rescinded following her dismissal. After a frantic dash to the church, Strike arrives just in time to see Robin and Matthew exchange vows. The novel ends as Robin turns at the altar, sees Strike, and beams.

Main Characters
Cormoran Strike – a veteran of the war in Afghanistan and an ex-SIB investigator who was honourably discharged from the military after losing half of his right leg in a bomb attack.

Robin Ellacott – Strike's assistant (originally his secretary) who has just completed a course in criminal investigation, paid for by Strike.

Donald Laing - a Scot from the Borders, formerly in the military where he and Strike first met.

Noel Brockbank - a former major from Barrow-in-Furness, who had served in both the first Gulf War and Bosnia, before becoming another long-time enemy of Strike's.

Terence 'Digger' Malley - a professional gangster and member of the Harringay Crime Syndicate.

Jeff Whittaker - stepfather of Strike and widower of Strike's mother Leda.

'Shanker' - Nickname of a former flatmate of Strike. He is willing to help Strike and Robin with just about anything in return for money.

Eric Wardle - The police detective inspector originally in charge of the case of the severed leg. He remained friendly with Strike after the events of the previous two novels. He dropped out of the case after the unexpected death of his brother, who was hit by a car.

Roy Carver - Wardle's replacement, who was the detective inspector who had been in charge of the Lula Landry case and who still harboured a grudge against Strike.

Matthew Cunliffe - Robin's fiancé, an accountant who distrusts Robin's relationship with Strike.

Reception
In The Guardian, reviewer Christobel Kent called the novel "daft but enjoyable", with a "narrative dizzying in its proliferation of character, location and detail, and tirelessly, relentlessly specific." She summarised, "the whole is delivered with such sheer gusto – and, crucially, such a confident hold on a deliriously clever plot – that most sensible readers will simply cave in and enjoy it."

On 30 May, Career of Evil was one of the six novels nominated for the title of Theakston Old Peculier crime novel of the year.

Sequel
In March 2017, Rowling posted a clue regarding the title of the fourth book in the series on her Twitter account. One fan guessed the title, with Rowling revealing that the title of her next book will be Lethal White.

On 23 March 2018, Rowling tweeted that she had completed the manuscript for Lethal White.

In other media

Television

The announcement that the novels would be adapted as a television series for BBC One, starting with The Cuckoo's Calling. was made on 10 December 2014. Rowling acted as executive producer of the series through her production company Brontë Film and Television, along with Neil Blair and Ruth Kenley-Letts. The three event dramas were based on scripts by Ben Richards who wrote The Cuckoo’s Calling, and Tom Edge who wrote The Silkworm and Career of Evil. Michael Keillor directed The Cuckoo’s Calling, Kieron Hawkes directed The Silkworm, and Charles Sturridge directed Career of Evil. Jackie Larkin produced.

The announcement that Tom Burke was set to play Cormoran Strike in Strike was made in September 2016. The announcement that Holliday Grainger would star as Strike's assistant, Robin Ellacott, was made in November 2016.

References

2015 British novels
Cormoran Strike series
Sphere Books books
British novels adapted into television shows